Overcoat Recordings is an American record label specializing in alt country and indie rock music. It is based in Chicago, Illinois, and its owner is Howard Greynolds, who was formerly an employee of Thrill Jockey.

Artists who have released material on Overcoat Recordings
Richard Buckner
Calexico with Iron and Wine
Catalystics & Confessionals
The Duck Boat Series
Nicolai Dunger
The Frames
GoGoGo Airheart
Glen Hansard & Marketa Irglova
Micah P. Hinson
Jim & Jennie and the Pinetops
Kingsbury Manx
Knife in the Water
Pit Er Pat
Sparrow
Tortoise with Bonnie Prince Billy

See also
 List of record labels

References

External links
Label profile at Discogs.com
Label profile at Allrecordlabels.com

American record labels
Alternative rock record labels
Indie rock record labels